José Sirvent Bas (31 August 1927 – 15 April 2011) was a Spanish football goalkeeper.

Club career
He began playing in several teams in the city of Alicante, mainly in the San Pedro Cup amateur tournament. After playing in the Alicante CF, Elche CF and Yeclano CF, joined Hércules CF. In the Hércules played 6 seasons in the Second Division. In the 1947-48 season Cosme was famous for being the goalkeeper who conceded 9 goals in a match against CD Málaga, all materialized by Pedro Bazán.

Then he transferred to Real Madrid, but only played 8 games in the first season. By refusing to be transferred, Madrid relegated him off the team two seasons. After being played for the Cultural Leonesa in La Liga, having a great season. He continued playing in Cultural several seasons after the descent.

Honours
Elche
Tercera División: 1944–45
Real Madrid
La Liga: 1953–54, 1954–55
Latin Cup: 1954–55

References

External links
 

1927 births
2011 deaths
People from Alacantí
Sportspeople from the Province of Alicante
Footballers from the Valencian Community
Spanish footballers
Association football goalkeepers
La Liga players
Alicante CF footballers
Elche CF players
Hércules CF players
Real Madrid CF players
Cultural Leonesa footballers
Yeclano CF players